The six-lined racerunner (Aspidoscelis sexlineatus) is a species of lizard native to the United States and Mexico.

Geographic range
The six-lined racerunner is found throughout much of the southeastern and south-central portion of the United States, from Maryland to Florida in the east, across the Great Plains to southern Texas and northern Mexico.  In a study conducted on A. sexlineata in Mexico, the majority of the individuals found were inhabiting areas near the seashore that were formed and influenced from maritime climate and hurricanes. The species' range also reaches north to Wisconsin and Minnesota. A small disjunct population is found in Tuscola County, Michigan.

Description

The six-lined racerunner is typically dark green, brown, or black in color, with six yellow or green-yellow stripes that extend down the body from head to tail. The underside is usually white in color on females, and a pale blue in males. Males also sometimes have a pale green-colored throat. They are slender-bodied, with a tail nearly twice the body length.

Behavior
Like other species of whiptail lizards, the six-lined racerunner is diurnal and insectivorous. The principal foods of A. sexlineata are spiders (Araneae 16.8%), grasshoppers (orthoptera 16.8%), and leaf hoppers (Homoptera 14.1%). They are wary, energetic, and fast moving, with speeds of up to 18 mph (29 kmh), darting for cover if approached. Aggressive behavior is common, as the dominant will chase the subordinate and often follow up with a bite to signify dominance.

Habitat
Due to its extensive range, A. sexlineata is found in a wide variety of habitats including grasslands, woodlands, open floodplains, or rocky outcroppings. Populations have also been found abundantly in areas that experience frequent fires. It prefers lower elevations, with dry loamy soils. In the lower elevations, the six-lined racerunner can be found in human-made disturbances like under voltage towers or along highways and railroads.

Reproduction
Breeding takes place in the spring and early summer, with up to six eggs being laid in mid-summer and hatching six to eight weeks later. A second clutch of eggs may be laid several weeks after the first. Males have been seen to perform an act termed "cloacal rubbing" to show arousal during breeding. This act entails the male rubbing its cloaca and pelvic region on the ground while simultaneously moving forward. Males will also perform an act termed "female tending" where the male will repeatedly charge at a female trying to leave its burrow until the female allows for the male to approach and begin the reproductive process.

Prey

They will predate upon spiders, grasshoppers, and large insects 3.

Subspecies
There are three recognized subspecies of A. sexlineatus:

Eastern six-lined racerunner, Aspidoscelis sexlineatus sexlineatus (Linnaeus, 1766)
Texas yellow-headed racerunner, Aspidoscelis sexlineatus stephensae Trauth, 1992
Prairie racerunner, Aspidoscelis sexlineatus viridis Lowe, 1966

Conservation status
The six-lined racerunner is listed as a species of concern in the state of Michigan, due to its limited population but otherwise holds no official conservation status.

See also
Aspidoscelis

References

External links

Animal Diversity Web: Cnemidophorus sexlineatus
SREL Herpetology: Six-lined Racerunner
Six-lined Racerunner, Reptiles and Amphibians of Iowa

Aspidoscelis
Fauna of Northeastern Mexico
Reptiles of the United States
Reptiles of Mexico
Reptiles described in 1766
Taxa named by Carl Linnaeus
Taxobox binomials not recognized by IUCN